The 2018–19 season will be Diósgyőri VTK's 53rd competitive season, 8th consecutive season in the OTP Bank Liga and 108th year in existence as a football club.

First team squad

Transfers

Summer

In:

Out:

Winter

In:

Out:

Statistics

Appearances and goals
Last updated on 19 May 2019.

|-
|colspan="14"|Players no longer at the club:

|}

Top scorers
Includes all competitive matches. The list is sorted by shirt number when total goals are equal.
Last updated on 19 May 2019

Disciplinary record
Includes all competitive matches. Players with 1 card or more included only.

Last updated on 19 May 2019

Overall
{|class="wikitable"
|-
|Games played || 36 (33 OTP Bank Liga and 3 Hungarian Cup)
|-
|Games won || 12 (10 OTP Bank Liga and 2 Hungarian Cup)
|-
|Games drawn || 8 (8 OTP Bank Liga and 0 Hungarian Cup)
|-
|Games lost || 16 (15 OTP Bank Liga and 1 Hungarian Cup)
|-
|Goals scored || 44
|-
|Goals conceded || 63
|-
|Goal difference || -19
|-
|Yellow cards || 82
|-
|Red cards || 3
|-
|rowspan="4"|Worst discipline ||  Richárd Vernes (9 , 0 )
|-
|  Mátyás Tajti (9 , 0 )
|-
|  Dejan Karan (7 , 1 )
|-
|  Dávid Márkvárt (9 , 0 )
|-
|rowspan="1"|Best result || 3–0 (H) v Újpest - Nemzeti Bajnokság I - 19-05-2019
|-
|rowspan="1"|Worst result || 0–7 (A) v Ferencváros - Nemzeti Bajnokság I - 02-03-2019
|-
|rowspan="2"|Most appearances ||  Dušan Brković (33 appearances)
|-
|  Florent Hasani (33 appearances)
|-
|rowspan="1"|Top scorer ||  Richárd Vernes (9 goals)
|-
|Points || 43/108 (39.81%)
|-

Nemzeti Bajnokság I

Matches

League table

Results summary

Results by round

Hungarian Cup

References

External links
 Official Website
 UEFA
 fixtures and results

Diósgyőri VTK seasons
Hungarian football clubs 2018–19 season